Li Li (李莉, born February 26, 1975, in Xingning County, Guangdong Province) is an artistic gymnast from China. She competed during the early 1990s, and retired in 1994. An Olympian, World Cup medallist and national champion, the beam was her best apparatus. Here, she pioneered the exceptionally difficult and innovative 1 turn on back in kip position, to which the skill is named after her. No other gymnast has been able to perform the maneuver with as many spins.

Career
Li made her international debut at the 1990 Goodwill Games in Seattle, USA, where she wowed the world with her trademark 1 back spin on the beam, as well as a rare German giant into a Tkatchev on the uneven bars. Later the same year, she won one gold (team) and silver (bars) at the Asian Games, followed by another silver (beam) at the World Cup (her teammate Yang Bo took the gold). The following year, she competed at the 1991 World Championships in Indianapolis where the Chinese team placed fourth.

At the 1992 Olympic Games, Li finished 14th in the all-round, and made the bars final where she placed eighth (9.887).  Her teammate Lu Li won the gold with a perfect 10.0, one of only two 10s awarded at those games. Again the Chinese women finished fourth in the team competition.

Li Li took the early lead in the all-around of the 1993 World Championships in Birmingham after performing on her best event, the beam. She stunned the crowd with a Yurchenko loop followed by the 1 back spin, and scored 9.837, the second highest score awarded on that night (Tatiana Lysenko got a 9.862 on her first vault). Li dropped to ninth place overall in the end after mediocre performance on other apparatus. She was in contention to win the beam gold in the event finals, but after a mistake on her Yang Bo jump, she decided to duplicate the element and as a result went over-time, which cost her two-tenths of a point and dropped her to fourth place (9.600). Without the deduction, she would have taken the silver. Another favorite for the gold, Shannon Miller, had a disastrous performance, falling from the beam twice and sitting on her dismount (7.850). The gold went to Lavinia Miloșovici (9.850), who had a simple and plain routine in comparison to Miller's and Li Li's.

Li went on to win the beam title in the 1993 East Asian Games and also the 1993 Chinese National Games. She was in the 1994 World Championships in Brisbane but failed to make the beam final, earning a 9.237. She retired from the sport soon after.

She is now a women's gymnastics coach at Buckeye Gymnastics in Westerville, Ohio.

Eponymous skills
Li has three eponymous skills listed in the Code of Points.

Competition history

References

External links
 
 

Chinese female artistic gymnasts
Living people
Gymnasts at the 1992 Summer Olympics
Originators of elements in artistic gymnastics
1975 births
Hakka sportspeople
Gymnasts from Guangdong
People from Xingning
Sportspeople from Meizhou
Asian Games medalists in gymnastics
Gymnasts at the 1990 Asian Games
Asian Games gold medalists for China
Asian Games silver medalists for China
Medalists at the 1990 Asian Games
Olympic gymnasts of China
Competitors at the 1990 Goodwill Games
Goodwill Games medalists in gymnastics